The South Windham Village Historic District encompasses a small rural village in southern Windham, Vermont.  Located at the junction of Windham Hill and Chase Roads, it has been little altered since the late 19th century.  The district was listed on the National Register of Historic Places in 1988.

Description and history
South Windham is a rural hill village, nestled in a now-forested valley in southernmost Windham, just across the town line with Jamaica on Windham Hill Road.  The village consists of eleven primary buildings, the most prominent being the 1825 Valley Bible Church, noted for its brick sides and rear wall and its Federal styling.  Most of the buildings in the village are houses, wood frame structures 1-1/2 to 2-1/2 stories in height, with vernacular Greek Revival features.  The other notable exception is the c. 1887 district schoolhouse, now a private residence.  The village once had a store, built c. 1855; it was demolished in 1987.

The village's economic history is typical of similar villages in Vermont's hill towns, rising in the early 19th century on an agricultural base, but later declining due to the difficulty of working the land.  Consequences of this decline, and a lack of later development, include the relatively large number of surviving agricultural buildings in the center, including several mid-19th century barns, and a number of chicken coops.  The most stylish of the houses is the Harrington-Brown House, built c. 1860 at the southern end of the village; it has pedimented windows on the first floor and an entablature on the main facade below the roof.

See also

National Register of Historic Places listings in Windham County, Vermont

References

Historic districts on the National Register of Historic Places in Vermont
Windham, Vermont
National Register of Historic Places in Windham County, Vermont
Historic districts in Windham County, Vermont